Limu or Limmu may refer to:

Places
Limmu (woreda), an area in the Oromia Region of Ethiopia
Limu, Estonia, a village in Estonia
Limu Lake, Estonia; a lake
, a town in Guangxi, China
Limu (Haʻapai), islet in Tonga

Other uses
Limmu, an Assyrian eponym
Limu (algae), a traditional Hawaiian food
Limu (Tongan mythology), a Tongan creator deity
Royal Tongan Limu, a juice/supplement product
Libyan International Medical University
Liberty Mutual, an American insurance provider utilizing "LiMu" as a shortened branding
A variety of coffee bean from the Limmu region of Ethiopia; see Coffee production in Ethiopia

See also